Praeovibos, also known as the giant muskox, is an extinct genus of bovid that contains a single species, Praeovibos priscus. This species used to be regarded as the ancestor to the modern muskox (Ovibos moschatus) but new findings suggest that these two species may be the same age.

The genus Praeovibos existed since the middle Pleistocene, around 1.5 million years ago. The giant muskox spread to Alaska around 1 million years ago. At the end of the Pleistocene this genus went extinct. Remains of the giant muskox were found with early human remains, indicated that this species was hunted by humans.

Description
Praeovibos priscus was larger than the modern muskox (Ovibos moschatus) with a shoulder height of 130–165 cm and longer, more massive limbs.

Distribution and habitat
The giant muskox was widespread during the Pleistocene, ranging from western Europe to Alaska and the Northern Yukon Territory. During the Glacial Periods Praeovibus priscus lived in the upland together with reindeer (Rangifer tarandus) and other alpine animals. This species also lived in open wooded or savanna-like habitat, however in Spain and England it has been found living in moist, temperate forests.

References

Pleistocene even-toed ungulates
Bovidae
Prehistoric monotypic mammal genera